Judith W. Baker (born April 10, 1960) is an American Democratic politician, small business owner, and educator from Missouri. She is a former member of the Missouri House of Representatives and a former Region VII Director for the United States Department of Health and Human Services. Baker was a candidate for Missouri State Treasurer in the 2016 election, but was defeated in the general election by Eric Schmitt.

Baker ran for the Missouri Senate in the 2020 general election for Missouri's 19th Senate District. She lost to incumbent Caleb Rowden.

Early life and education 
Judy Baker was born in Columbia, Missouri to elementary school teacher Beverly (Briggs) Wall and physician Dr. Norman Wall. Her father was a military doctor, which prompted several moves for the family during her youth. Baker graduated in 1978 from Western Branch High School in Chesapeake, Virginia. She went on to obtain a B.S. in Educational Psychology from the University of Missouri in 1981, a M.A. in Divinity from the Southern Baptist Theological Seminary in 1986, and a M.A. in Health Administration from the University of Missouri in 2002. Prior to entering politics Baker worked a variety of jobs in the healthcare management field until starting her own consulting firm, Cura Advantage. Baker has served as an adjunct professor at Columbia College, the University of Missouri, Washington University in St. Louis, and New York University.

Personal life
She resides in Columbia with her husband, Dr. John Baker, a Baptist minister, and three children.

Politics
Judy Baker was first elected to the Missouri House in November 2004, defeating Republican Robert (Bob) Northrup. She ran unopposed in 2006 to earn her second term. While in the Missouri House she founded the bi-partisan "Healthy Missourians" caucus, a group who advocated preventative medicine and responsible approaches to Missouri healthcare.

In 2008 Baker aspired to higher office, running for U.S. Congress in Missouri's 9th Congressional District to replace Kenny Hulshof. After beating three fellow Democrats in the August primary Baker lost a close November general election to Republican and fellow State Representative Blaine Luetkemeyer. Following the defeat Baker returned to the private sector and teaching at Columbia College until November, 2009 when she was appointed the regional HHS director by Health & Human Services Secretary Kathleen Sebelius. Baker would hold that position for just over two years until resigning in early December, 2011.

Baker was one of eight Democratic candidates for Missouri Lieutenant Governor in 2012. She came in second to former Missouri State Auditor Susan Montee, who was defeated in the general election by Republican incumbent Peter Kinder.

In the 2016 election cycle, Baker filed as a candidate for Missouri State Treasurer. Her only opponent for the Democratic nomination was Patrick Contreras, of Kansas City, whom she defeated 59% to 41%. She went on to face term-limited Republican State Senator Eric Schmitt of suburban St. Louis, as well as two third-party candidates and a write-in candidate, in the November general election. Schmitt won with 56.65% of the vote, to Baker's 39.15%.

In the 2020 election cycle, Baker was the sole Democratic candidate for the Missouri Senate, District 19, taking on incumbent Caleb Rowden, who was unopposed in the Republican primary. She lost 48.33% to 51.60%.

Electoral history

State Representative

United States Representative

Lieutenant Governor

Treasurer

State Senate

References

Official Manual, State of Missouri, 2005-2006. Jefferson City, MO: Secretary of State.

External links

Missouri House of Representatives - Representative Judy Baker (D) 25th District official MO House website
 Judy Baker for MO Senate 2020 Campaign website
 http://www.showmebaker.com/
U.S. Congress campaign contributions at OpenSecrets.org
Follow the Money - Judy Baker
2006 2004 Missouri House campaign contributions

1960 births
Living people
Democratic Party members of the Missouri House of Representatives
Southern Baptist Theological Seminary alumni
University of Missouri alumni
Baptists from Virginia
Columbia College (Missouri) faculty
Politicians from Columbia, Missouri
Politicians from Chesapeake, Virginia
United States Department of Health and Human Services officials
Women state legislators in Missouri
American women academics
21st-century American women